The Goldsboro Goldbugs were an Eastern Carolina League (1929) and Coastal Plain League (1937–1941, 1946–1949) baseball team based in Goldsboro, North Carolina, United States. Don Heffner played for the Goldsboro Goldbugs.

After changing their moniker, Goldsboro continued minor league baseball play as members of the Class D Coastal Plain League. The Goldsboro Cardinals played in the 1950–1951 seasons as an affiliate of the St. Louis Cardinals. In their final season of play, the Goldsboro Jets concluded the tenure in the Coastal Plain League.

References

Goldsboro, North Carolina
Baseball teams established in 1929
Baseball teams disestablished in 1949
1929 establishments in North Carolina
1949 disestablishments in North Carolina
Defunct minor league baseball teams
Defunct baseball teams in North Carolina
Eastern Carolina League teams
Coastal Plain League (minor league) teams